The  Center for Genetic Engineering and Biotechnology (CIGB) is a research institute in Havana, Cuba. It is responsible for creating the Abdala vaccine.

The Centre developed the COVID-19 vaccine Mambisa which is in the final stages of clinical trials.

See also 
 BioCubaFarma

References

External links 
 

Medical research institutes in Cuba
Research institutes established in 1985
COVID-19 vaccine producers